Alloniscus is the sole genus in the woodlice family Alloniscidae. There are more than 20 described species in Alloniscus.

Species
These 23 species belong to the genus Alloniscus:

 Alloniscus allspachi Nunomura, 2001
 Alloniscus balssii (Verhoeff, 1928)
 Alloniscus boninensis Nunomura, 1984
 Alloniscus gerardi Arcangeli, 1960
 Alloniscus maculatus Nunomura, 1984
 Alloniscus marinus Collinge, 1920
 Alloniscus mirabilis (Stuxberg, 1875)
 Alloniscus nacreus Collinge, 1922
 Alloniscus nicobaricus Budde-Lund, 1885
 Alloniscus oahuensis Budde-Lund, 1885
 Alloniscus pallidulus (Budde-Lund, 1885)
 Alloniscus pardii Arcangeli, 1960
 Alloniscus perconvexus Dana, 1856
 Alloniscus pigmentatus Budde-Lund, 1885
 Alloniscus porcellioides Budde-Lund, 1904
 Alloniscus priolensis Arcangeli, 1960
 Alloniscus robustus Ferrara, 1974
 Alloniscus ryukyuensis Nunomura, 1984
 Alloniscus saipanensis Nunomura, 2001
 Alloniscus salinarum Vandel, 1968
 Alloniscus schadleri Arcangeli, 1960
 Alloniscus silvestrii Arcangeli, 1960
 Alloniscus thalassophilus Rioja, 1964

References

Further reading

 

Woodlice
Articles created by Qbugbot